Aqueduct Racetrack is a Thoroughbred horse racing facility and casino in the South Ozone Park and Jamaica neighborhoods of Queens, New York City, United States. Aqueduct is the only racetrack located within New York City limits. Its racing meets are usually from late October/early November through April. The racetrack is located adjacent to a casino called Resorts World New York City.

The track itself has three courses. The track has seating capacity of 17,000 and total capacity of 40,000. The facility houses the headquarters of the New York Racing Association (NYRA).

In December 2022 the New York Racing Association formally announced its intention to upgrade the facilities at nearby Belmont Park to make it suitable to host year-round thoroughbred racing and training, which would ultimately lead to the closure of Aqueduct Racetrack. The plans are contingent on NYRA receiving state-backed bonds to fund the construction projects at Belmont.

History
Operating near the site of a former conduit of the Brooklyn Waterworks that brought water from eastern Long Island to the Ridgewood Reservoir, Aqueduct Racetrack opened on September 27, 1894, by the Queens County Jockey Club. The track was named "Aqueduct" after the former Ridgewood Aqueduct. The facility was expanded and a new clubhouse was constructed before the 1941 summer meet.

In 1955, the Greater New York Association took over Aqueduct along with Belmont Park, Saratoga Race Course, and Jamaica Race Course, deciding to make major upgrades to Aqueduct, after which Jamaica Race Course would be sold for redevelopment as a housing project. Aqueduct closed in 1956, reopening September 14, 1959, after $33 million of renovations designed by noted racetrack architect Arthur Froehlich of the firm Arthur Froehlich and Associates of Beverly Hills, California. The Equestris Restaurant in the clubhouse opened in 1981 and was the largest restaurant in New York City at the time. Additional renovations were made in 2001, 2006, and 2007.

Before 1976, the Inner Dirt Track was a turf course and was known as the Main Turf Course, with the present turf course being the Inner Turf Course; following the conclusion of racing in 1975 the grass on the Main Turf Course was uprooted and the Inner Dirt Track took its place to permit year-round racing. (In the years after Aqueduct was rebuilt in 1959 the track lay idle from early November until April 1; by 1971 this period had been reduced to from just before Christmas until March 1, around when off-track betting began in New York City, creating a demand for horse racing to be contested in the region year-round.)

Currently, one annual meeting is held at Aqueduct, usually from the last Wednesday in October until the first Sunday in May. Races had been run on the Inner Dirt Track between the Wednesday after Thanksgiving until just before the Wood Memorial in recent years. Prior to 1977, a summer meeting also was held at Aqueduct, from mid-June to late July. The Wood Memorial is Aqueduct's marquee race, which culminates the winter meet. The Remsen and Cigar Mile are major races that begin the winter meet.  The prestigious Jockey Club Gold Cup was usually run there between 1958 and 1974, and what was perhaps the track's most distinctive race, the marathon  Display Handicap, was last contested in 1990.

From 1963 through 1967, races normally run at Belmont Park, including the Belmont Stakes, were run at Aqueduct while Belmont's grandstand was being rebuilt. The track played host to the second ever Breeders' Cup on November 2, 1985.

Aqueduct is the site of the first (and still the only) triple dead heat for the win in a stakes race. In the 1944 running of the Carter Handicap, Brownie, Bossuet, and Wait A Bit hit the finish line at the same time.  On April 8, 2006, during an eleven-race program at Aqueduct that included the Wood Memorial Stakes, a rare event happened when dead heats for each of the three "money" positions (Win, Place, and Show) occurred in three separate races: Saint Anddan and Criminal Mind dead-heated for Place in Race 5; Naragansett and Emotrin dead-heated for Show in Race 6; and Karakorum Tuxedo and Megatrend dead-heated for Win in Race 10.

Hall of Fame horse Cigar won the first two races in his 16-race win streak at Aqueduct. After he switched from grass to dirt, Cigar's first win was by eight lengths in an allowance race on October 28, 1994, and was followed by a seven-length win in the NYRA Mile on November 26, 1994, a Grade 1 race that was renamed in the horse's honor in 1997.  On May 31, 1965, 73,375 spectators were on hand at Aqueduct and watched Gun Bow win the Metropolitan Mile.  At the time, it was the largest crowd to ever attend a thoroughbred horse racing event in New York.

Champion racehorse Secretariat was retired at Aqueduct before the public on November 6, 1973. He was paraded for the last time to the public and took his last steps on a racetrack there. He was then sent to stud at Claiborne Farm.

Pope John Paul II celebrated Mass in front of a crowd of 75,000 at Aqueduct on October 6, 1995.  Every weekend including Tuesdays, a flea market containing 500 vendors was operated in the racetrack's north parking lot, located along Rockaway Boulevard.  Aqueduct Flea Market offered a hodgepodge of goods, such as bedding, incense, pots and pans, and nearly everything imaginable.  It was open on Tuesdays and weekends year-round for 33 years.  The Aqueduct Flea Market closed in 2011.

In May 2017, NYRA announced that they would resurface the 1⅛-mile main track with a limestone base, and convert the inner dirt track back into a turf course. The changes were completed in time for the start of the 2017 fall meet on November 3. With this change, the main track will now be used for winter racing.

Proposal to close track
In May 2007, reports indicated that then-New York Governor Eliot Spitzer was considering closing Aqueduct and selling the  track and its stables, which currently house 400 horses, to developers when the New York Racing Association lease expired at the end of 2007. Belmont Park would have been modified to handle winter requirements, which would have included heated stands and the construction of new stables. According to the plans that were discussed, the oldest and most historic track in the state, Saratoga Race Course, would have been operated by the New York Racing Association, and a new entity would have operated Belmont Park. Aqueduct traditionally has been considered a track frequented by blue collar fans while Belmont Park has a more upscale reputation.

State Assembly Member Audrey I. Pheffer (D), whose district included Aqueduct, fought the closing of the track, which she felt was important to the local community.  Any closure at Aqueduct, which is equipped for the cold winter months, would have required millions of dollars in renovations at Belmont, a summer-only track. Belmont is also hampered by its north-oriented grandstand, which would cause shadows in the winter months. Belmont is one of few racecourses in the United States (Santa Anita Park and Thistledown Racecourse being the others) to be north-oriented. Most others are oriented either east or (rarely) west or south.  NYRA was planning to cease all operations after completing the racing card of February 10, 2008.  This was averted when a deal was reached with NYRA and New York State.  To help raise capital, NYRA sold  of vacant land near Aqueduct in June 2009. The land that was auctioned off consisted of residential lots to the west of the IND Rockaway Line.

Resorts World New York City

Resorts World New York City is part of the Aqueduct Racetrack complex.  It was proposed in the late 2000s and opened in late 2011.  Aside from its being the first legal casino in New York City, it is the only casino located in the five boroughs and the only casino besides Empire City Casino and Jake's 58 in Islandia in the New York City region.

Casino 
The casino features four automated table games: Baccarat, Blackjack, Craps, and Roulette in addition to a wide array of video slot machines.  Baccarat is played with real playing cards, but they are dealt inside a machine without any human dealers.

History 
The New York State Legislature legalized video gambling devices at racetracks in 2001. However, the opening of a racino at the track hit various problems. Video lottery terminals similar to slot machines were approved at five locations, including Aqueduct, Finger Lakes Race Track, Monticello Raceway, Vernon Downs, and Yonkers Raceway. The revenue would be divided between the racetracks and the State and would allow tracks to increase purses and to attract better quality horses in races.

In 2007, the State issued a request for proposals to operate the video lottery terminals at Aqueduct. Among the bids received was a $2 billion proposal by the Shinnecock Indian Nation to open a casino at the track.  The proposal was in conjunction with Marian Ilitch, a co-owner of the Detroit Red Wings. The proposal according to most sources was dead on arrival since, even if the Shinnecocks received official Bureau of Indian Affairs recognition as a tribe, the Aqueduct Casino would still have to be approved by the New York State Legislature and the Bureau of Indian Affairs; and Aqueduct would have to first be taken into trust by the Department of Interior, as the Shinnecocks historically had not owned property in Queens.  In October 2008, the State selected the Delaware North as the winning bidder among three proposals to build a racino at Aqueduct. The  facility would include 4,500 slot machines. However, these plans fell apart in March 2009 when the developer was unable to make a $370 million upfront payment to the State. 

In July 2009, seven companies submitted bids to develop a racino at Aqueduct: Aqueduct Entertainment Group, Delaware North, MGM Mirage, Mohegan Sun, Penn National Gaming, SL Green Realty, and Wynn Resorts. Some developers indicated that a portion of the slot machines could open as early as April 2010. However, the selection of an operator for the casino was delayed for several months because State officials frequently changed the rules and could not reach an agreement on the winning bidder, prompting Wynn to pull out of the running in November. On January 29, 2010, Governor David Paterson announced that the Aqueduct Entertainment Group would run the casino.

Aqueduct Entertainment Group partners included GreenStar Services Corporation, Turner Construction Company, Levine Builders, The Darman Group, Empowerment Development Corporation, Navegante Group, PS&S Design, Siemens AG, and Clairvest Group.  The appointment generated controversy because of charges that AEG, which had the worst initial bid of those bidding, was allowed to change its bid so that it had the best.  Paterson was reported to have demanded that the ownership of an affirmative action component.  During this time rapper Jay-Z, through his company Gain Global Investments Network LLC, then got a 7% ownership of AEG; and charges were made that Jay-Z and Paterson had a personal relationship.  U.S. prosecutors investigated the bidding process, particularly in light of the fact that AEG won the bid two days after Queens megachurch pastor Floyd Flake (who is also an AEG investor) threatened to switch his support in the 2010 governor race from Paterson to Andrew Cuomo.  New York house speaker Sheldon Silver also threatened not to sign off on the deal.  Paterson maintained there was no quid pro quo.  On March 9, 2010, Paterson, Flake, and Jay-Z withdrew from further involvement.  Paterson said he was recusing himself on the advice of his lawyers.  Flake, who had 0.6% share, said the case was distracting from his other projects.  On March 11, 2010, the State withdrew its support for the AEG bid and announced that a new group would be selected through an "expedited, transparent, apolitical, and publicly accountable process." Aqueduct Entertainment Group said it intended to sue.

On June 2, 2010, New York Lottery officials announced that six groups were considering submitting bids to develop the racino. These include three of the previous bidders (Delaware North, Penn National Gaming, and SL Green Realty) and three new groups (Empire City Casino at Yonkers Raceway, Genting New York LLC, and Clairvest Group). On June 29, three of the firms submitted bids: SL Green/Hard Rock Cafe, Genting Group, and Penn National. Clairvest participated in the SL Green/Hard Rock Cafe bid.

The bids from Penn and SL Green were disqualified in July for not meeting requirements. On August 3, 2010, Lottery officials announced they had accepted Genting Group's $380 million upfront licensing fee bid, which was $55 million more than the closest competing bid.  Its business model includes targeting flyers stranded at John F. Kennedy Airport. The company said its plans involve 1,200 construction jobs and 800 permanent jobs, and that it will bring the state $500 million a year in revenue. Genting opened the Resorts World Casino New York City on October 28, 2011, with 2,280 gaming terminals.

The casino opened in late 2011. In August 2021, a Hyatt Regency hotel opened on the site of the casino. It is owned by Genting Group, which also owns Resorts World.

Collapse of the New York City Off-Track Betting Corporation
On December 10, 2010, the New York City Off-Track Betting Corporation, formerly owned by the City of New York but taken over by the State in order to preserve off-track betting in New York City, financially collapsed and was forced to permanently close. As a result, the Aqueduct Racetrack saw an increase in patrons for the first time in several years. For example, on December 11, one day after NYCOTB's closure, the number of patrons who entered Aqueduct's doors increased 61% (5,444 customers) compared to the previous year (3,378 customers). The New York Racing Association, which owns Aqueduct, took advantage by offering former NYCOTB customers free bus shuttle service from select former NYCOTB branches to Aqueduct Racetrack with a free hot dog, soft drink, and Post Parade program.

Proposal for convention center
On January 4, 2012, Governor Andrew Cuomo announced the construction of a new convention center on the Aqueduct Racetrack to replace the aging Javits Center. This would be the country's largest convention center, featuring hotels, restaurants, and expanded gambling.  Building the convention center would require additional land, which could include nearby City-owned lots leased to the Port Authority of New York and New Jersey for airport parking or the adjacent racetrack (as racing could be consolidated to Belmont Park).

On June 1, 2012, Governor Cuomo announced that plans to build the convention center had been canceled.

Track announcers and television personalities
Sportscaster Tom Durkin was the chief track announcer at Aqueduct and the other NYRA tracks until his retirement on August 31, 2014. Races are now called by NYRA track announcer John Imbriale. TV personalities have included:

 Harvey Pack (1995–1999)
 Paul Corman (1995–1999)
 John M. Veitch (1995–1999) 
 John Imbriale (1995–2005)
 Jan Rushton (1995–2009)
 Jason Blewitt (2006–2017)
 Eric Donovan (2006–present)
 Andy Serling (2008–present)
 Rich McCarthy (1995–1999)
 Mike Watchmaker (1995–1999)
 Michael Sherack (1997–2000)
 Kelly Gecewicz (2000–2005)
 Mary Ryan (1995–1999)
 Travis Stone (2014–2017)
 Maggie Wolfendale (2010–present)

Acacia Clement (2022-present)

Racing
The following graded stakes will run at Aqueduct in 2022:

Grade I:
 Carter Handicap
 Cigar Mile Handicap

Grade II:
 Demoiselle Stakes
 Gazelle Stakes
 Remsen Stakes
 Red Smith Handicap
 Wood Memorial Stakes

Grade III:

Non-Graded:

Transportation

The track has its own New York City Subway station, Aqueduct Racetrack, served by the IND Rockaway Line. It has only one platform on the Brooklyn-bound side, requiring southbound travelers to transfer to a northbound train at Aqueduct–North Conduit Avenue station, which is located a few blocks to the south. NYRA also operates a free shuttle bus between the North Conduit Avenue station and the Clubhouse entrance.

The Q37 bus route serves Aqueduct Racetrack and was rerouted in 2011 to serve the casino.  The Q7, Q11 and Q41 bus routes also pass nearby.

In popular culture
 The film Lucky Number Slevin features scenes at "Aqueduct Racetrack", which were filmed at a track in Canada.
 There is a scene with Aqueduct Racetrack in the movie A Bronx Tale.
 In The Odd Couple episode "Felix the Horse Player", Felix and Oscar go to Aqueduct.
 The Sopranos episode "Pie-O-My" features a number of scenes at the racetrack.

See also
 New York Racing Association
 Belmont Park
 Saratoga Race Course

References

External links

 Aqueduct Racetrack official site
 Vendors at Aqueduct Flea Market Seek New Home as Closing Nears
 A Flea Market Considers Its Fate in a Casino World

 

 
Casinos in New York (state)
Horse racing venues in New York City
New York Racing Association
Sports venues in Queens, New York
1894 establishments in New York (state)
Sports venues completed in 1894
Ozone Park, Queens